This is a list of martyrs' monuments and memorials sorted by country:

Algeria
Maqam Echahid, Algiers

Azerbaijan
 Baku Turkish Martyrs' Memorial

Bangladesh
Jatiyo Smriti Soudho, Dhaka
Shaheed Minar, Dhaka
Martyred Intellectuals Memorial, Dhaka
Swadhinata Stambha, Dhaka

China
Yuhuatai Memorial Park of Revolutionary Martyrs

Egypt
Port Said Martyrs Memorial

Ethiopia 
Martyrs Memorial Monument, Bahir Dar
Martyrs Memorial Monument, Mek'ele
"Red Terror" Martyrs' Memorial Museum, Addis Ababa

France
Mémorial des Martyrs de la Déportation

Germany 
 Radiation Martyrs' Memorial, Hamburg

India
Martyrs' Memorial Patna
Hussainiwala National Martyrs Memorial
Telangana Martyrs Memorial
INA Martyr's Memorial
Azad Maidan
Bhasha Smritistambha
Hutatma Chowk
Namantar Shahid Smarak
Shaheed Minar, Kolkata

Iraq
Al-Shaheed Monument, Baghdad

Japan
Twenty-Six Martyrs Museum and Monument, Nagasaki

Jordan
The Martyrs' Memorial and Museum

Lebanon
Martyrs’ Monument, Beirut

Romania
Martyrs' Monument, Arad

Turkey
Aviation Martyrs' Monument, Istanbul
Çanakkale Martyrs' Memorial, Çanakkale
Mersin Martyrs' Memorial, Mersin
Battle of Otlukbeli Martyrs' Monument, Otlukbeli

United Arab Emirates
Wahat Al Karama

United Kingdom

Amersham Martyrs Memorial, Amersham, Buckinghamshire
Marian Martyrs' Monument, Smithfield, London
Martyrs' Memorial, Oxford
Plaque commemorating Robert Ferrar, Nott Square, Carmarthen, Wales
Martyrs' Monument, St Andrews, which commemorates Patrick Hamilton, Henry Forrest, George Wishart and Walter Milne
Political Martyrs' Monument, Edinburgh
Stratford Martyrs' Memorial

There are other memorials at Lewes in Sussex,
and in other places.

United States
Armenian Martyrs Memorial in Providence, Rhode Island
Confederate Martyrs Monument in Jeffersontown, Kentucky
Confederate Soldiers Martyrs Monument in Eminence, Kentucky
Haymarket Martyrs' Monument, Illinois
Martyrs Monument in Midway, Kentucky
Prison Ship Martyrs' Monument, Brooklyn, New York City
Thompson and Powell Martyrs Monument, Kentucky

References 

Martyrs
01